Eugène Boré (1809– 1878) was a French missionary, linguist, and translator.

Biography 
Eugène Boré was born on 15 August 1809 in Angers, France. In 1829, he joined the Abbé Félicité de Lamennais. In 1839, Boré worked as a missionary and created the first French school in Tabriz, Qajar Iran.

Member of the Asiatic Society in 1833, he won fame in the "Journal Asiatique". He was professor of Armenian (1833–34) at the Collège de France. Sent to Venice, he published the results of his literary labours there in the convent of the Mechitarists. Spending six months of 1837 in study at Constantinople, he went with Father Scaffi, C.M., to Erzerum in Armenia. At Tauris he started a school as an opening wedge for Christianity, whose service was always his chief concern. The Shah of Persia honoured him for the excellence of his school. In addition to many learned studies sent to France, his interesting letters were published as "The Correspondence of a Traveller in the Orient". In 1841 he secured Lazarist missioners for Persia. For services to France in that land he was given the cross of the Legion of Honour. Gregory XVI made him a Knight of the Golden Militia in 1842 and Knight of St. Gregory the Great in 1843. Knowing forty Oriental idioms, most of them thoroughly, he published in some of these tongues excellent controversial works. He was eager for the return of the schismatics to the Church and was aided in his apostolate by his wide acquaintance with the most learned and influential men of France and Italy. He published an illuminating report of the condition of the Holy Land whither he was sent by France to investigate in 1847. Entering the Congregation of the Mission in Jan., 1849, at Constantinople, he was ordained there, 7 April, 1850, and made his vows in Paris in January, 1851. Sent to Constantinople, as head of the College of Bebek, he remained fifteen years doing zealous work for the Mussulmans as well as Christians especially on the battlefield during the Crimean War. In Paris in 1866 he was made secretary general, and was elected superior general of the Congregation of the Mission, 11 September, 1874. His incumbency of the latter office was cut short at the end of four years by a sudden illness.

He died at Maison-Mere in Paris on 3 May 1878.

References

French Roman Catholic missionaries
1809 births
1878 deaths
French orientalists